Oleandra hainanensis is a species of fern in the family Oleandraceae. It is endemic to China. Its natural habitat is subtropical or tropical moist lowland forests. It is threatened by habitat loss.

References

Polypodiales
Flora of China
Endangered plants
Taxonomy articles created by Polbot
Plants described in 1959